Supplement is the fourth studio album by , released on 22 April 2009. Excluding the bonus track, the album contains eight new songs and three songs compiled from past singles. The lyrics of the bonus track, were penned by Nonaka herself.

Track listing
VOICE

Hop Step Love
Sweet Sunny Day

Melody

(BONUS TRACK)

DVD (PV CLIPS) (Initial Limited Edition Only)
Sweet Sunny Day

References
Official Discography of Ai Nonaka

2009 albums
Ai Nonaka albums